Holhol is a town in the Ali Sabieh Region of Djibouti. Holhol enjoys a semi-arid climate (Köppen: BSh). The surrounding district is rich in both livestock and fledgling agriculture. It is notable for being the birthplace of Cheik Osman Waiss a nationalist and anti-colonial where he began his movement.

History

The Holhol area has been inhabited since ancient times with  nomadics sometimes stopping here for water on the way to the town of Zeila, Tadjoura and after the signing treaties in 1894 with the then ruling Ugaas of Issa Somali, to established a protectorate in the region referred to as French Somaliland. The railway reached this location on 14 July 1899. Holhol became an administrative and commercial centre in the 1900s after the construction of the Ethio-Djibouti Railways, the first railway in French Somaliland.

Overview
Holhol is served by a station on the meter gauge Ethio-Djibouti Railway. A notable feature of the meter-gauge railway is a viaduct, 29 meters high and 45 meters long, that was built in 1900.  The station is a transit point for commercial goods from Ethiopia.  Holhol also has a station on the new standard gauge Addis Ababa–Djibouti Railway.

The town also lies along RN-5 National Highway. It is the seventh largest city in the country.

Additionally, Holhol has a number of primary and secondary schools as well as nurseries. The El-Hajj Hassan Gouled Military Academy is located here. One kilometer from the town is the local college. Nearby towns and villages include Ali Sabieh (33 km), Goubetto (18 km), Ali Adde (23 km), Dasbiyo (18 km) and Chabelley (28 km).

Demographics
As of 2017, the population of Holhol has been estimated to be roughly around 3,000. The city inhabitants belong to various mainly Afro-Asiatic-speaking ethnic groups, with the Issa Somali predominant.

Climate
Holhol is located in the central Ali Sabieh Region, and has a hot arid climate (BWh) under the Köppen-Geiger system. Weather in Holhol, much like other inland towns in Djibouti, is warm and dry year-round. The town limited rainfall of  usually comes with two peaks during March–May and September–October. Holhol's landscape is semi-desert and fairly flat with wadi valleys.

See also
Railway stations in Ethiopia
List of reduplicated place names

References

Populated places in Djibouti